Wildsville is an unincorporated community in Concordia Parish, Louisiana, United States. Wildsville had a post office until May 13, 1995; it still has its own ZIP code, 71377.

References

Unincorporated communities in Concordia Parish, Louisiana
Unincorporated communities in Louisiana